A molecule is an electrically neutral group of two or more atoms held together by chemical bonds.

Molecule, molecules, or molecular may also refer to:
 Molecules (journal)
 "Molecules", a song by Disclosure on their Caracal album
 "Molecules", a song by Hayley Kiyoko song on her Expectations album
 The Molecules, an American band
 Molecule (comics), a superhero in the DC Comics universe
 Molecular (game), a chemistry-themed strategy game from Inside The Box Board Games
 Molecular (Mutant X), a type of science-fiction character